Swansea East Dock railway station served the city of Swansea, in the historical county of Glamorganshire, Wales, from 1880 to 1936 on the Swansea and Neath Railway.

History 
The station was opened on 1 October 1880 by the Great Western Railway. It was known as Swansea East Dock Fabians Bay in the handbook of stations. The engine shed closed in 1964. The station closed on 28 September 1936.

References 

Disused railway stations in Swansea
Former Great Western Railway stations
Railway stations in Great Britain opened in 1880
Railway stations in Great Britain closed in 1936
1880 establishments in Wales
1936 disestablishments in Wales